Thongvan Fanmuong was a Cambodian major general who served in the Khmer National Armed Forces under the Khmer Republic regime of Lon Nol. He was a graduate of the French Ecole d'Etat Major and Ecole de Guerre. He was a member of the supreme committee of the Republic of Cambodia, along with General Sak Sutsakhan, Long Boret, Hang Thun Hak, Op Kim Ang, General Ear Chhong (Chief of Staff of the Air Force), and Admiral Vong Sarendy (Chief of the Navy Staff). The committee tried to "organize a surrender" as the Khmer Rouge took over the country.

References

External links
 Letter of the government of the United States to General Thongvan Fanmuong 

Fanmuong,Thongvan
Cambodian generals